The First Gorton ministry (Liberal–Country Coalition) was the 44th ministry of the Government of Australia. It was led by the country's 19th Prime Minister, John Gorton. The First Gorton ministry succeeded the McEwen ministry, which dissolved on 10 January 1968 following the election of Gorton as Liberal leader after the disappearance of former Prime Minister Harold Holt. The ministry was replaced by the Second Gorton ministry on 12 November 1969 following the 1969 federal election.

As of 26 January 2023, Ian Sinclair and Peter Nixon are the last surviving members of the First Gorton ministry. James Forbes was the last surviving Liberal minister, and Malcolm Fraser was the last surviving Liberal Cabinet minister.

Cabinet

Outer ministry

Notes

Ministries of Elizabeth II
Gorton, 1
1968 establishments in Australia
1969 disestablishments in Australia
Cabinets established in 1968
Cabinets disestablished in 1969